Ashutosh Sabharwal is a professor and Ph.D of electrical engineering from Rice University, Houston, TX. He was named Fellow of the Institute of Electrical and Electronics Engineers (IEEE) in 2014 for contributions to the theory and experimentation of wireless systems and networks. He was named to the 2022 class of ACM Fellows, "for the invention of full-duplex wireless and open-source wireless research platforms".

References

Fellow Members of the IEEE
Fellows of the Association for Computing Machinery
Living people
Year of birth missing (living people)
Place of birth missing (living people)
American electrical engineers